"Walking on the Moon" is a reggae song by British rock band the Police, released as the second single from their second studio album, Reggatta de Blanc (1979). The song was written by the band's lead vocalist and bassist Sting. It went on to become the band's second  hit in the UK.

Background
Sting has said that he wrote the song when he was drunk one night after a concert in Munich. The following morning, he remembered the song and wrote it down.

In his autobiography, Sting implies that the song was partially inspired by an early girlfriend:

According to Sting, the song was originally recorded "as a rocker" in early versions, but it was reworked. The riff, which is played on the bass, was described as "weird" and "jazzy" by Sting. Guitarist Andy Summers came up with the chord "which hits after the bass notes" throughout the song.

"Walking on the Moon" was released as the follow-up single to the British  single "Message in a Bottle" in late 1979. The song was the Police's second number-one hit single in the United Kingdom. A music video for the song was shot at the Kennedy Space Center in Florida on 23 October 1979. It features the band members miming to the track amidst spacecraft displays, interspersed with NASA footage. Both Sting and Andy Summers strum guitars (not bass) in the video, and Stewart Copeland strikes his drumsticks on a Saturn V moon rocket.

The B-side to the song, "Visions of the Night", was written by Sting. He said of the song, "This was the first song I wrote after going to London. It was hard to be serious about the whole thing. I was bemused, much to Stewart [Copeland]'s disgust." According to Copeland, the song was "too cerebral for [the band's] early audiences," so Sting would call it "Three O'Clock Shit", the title of a rejected Police song that appears as "Three O'Clock Shot" on Strontium 90: Police Academy.

Composition
"Walking on the Moon" has a "sparse" arrangement, centred around a three-note bass riff. It is one of the Police's more reggae-influenced songs.

Music video
The video was shot at the Kennedy Space Center in Florida on October 23, 1979. It features the band playing their respective instruments near a Saturn V moon rocket (although Sting is seen with an electric guitar, not bass) intercut with some NASA footage. It was directed by Derek Burbidge.

Track listing
7" A&M / AMS 7494 (UK)
 "Walking on the Moon" (Edit) – 3:59 (This edit has never been officially released on CD.)
 "Visions of the Night" – 3:05

12" A&M / AMSP 7494 (UK)
 "Walking on the Moon" – 4:59
 "Visions of the Night" – 3:05

Charts

Weekly charts

Year-end charts

Personnel
 Sting – Lead and backing vocals, bass guitar, double bass
 Andy Summers – Guitar, synthesizer
 Stewart Copeland – Drums

References

The Police songs
1979 singles
1980 singles
UK Singles Chart number-one singles
Jimmy Nail songs
Songs written by Sting (musician)
Song recordings produced by Nigel Gray
1979 songs
A&M Records singles
Reggae rock songs
Songs about the Moon